Neocypetes is a genus of beetles in the family Buprestidae, containing the following species:

Neocypetes compactus (Berg, 1889)
Neocypetes guttulatus (Farimaire & Germain, 1858)
Neocypetes lethierryi (Thery, 1896)

References

Buprestidae genera